Diodon is a clipboard manager for GNOME/GTK+ with application indicator support.

The application provides Unity indicator applet support and also Unity Dash support. The developers updated the logos and added new experimental Zeitgeist integration in 2012.

References

Clipboard (computing)
Linux software
GNOME Applications
Clipboard utilities that use GTK
Free software programmed in Vala